West of Rainbow's End is a 1938 American Western film directed by Alan James and written by Stanley Roberts and Gennaro Rea. The film stars Tim McCoy, Kathleen Eliot, Walter McGrail, George Cooper, Mary Carr and Bob Kortman. The film was released on January 12, 1938, by Monogram Pictures.

Plot

Cast           
Tim McCoy as Tim Hart
Kathleen Eliot as Joan Carter 
Walter McGrail as George Reynolds / Johnson
George Cooper as Happy
Mary Carr as Mrs. Martha Carter
Bob Kortman as Speck
Hank Bell as Joe
Frank LaRue as Lightning Ed
Reed Howes as Ted Crane
Edward Coxen as Joel Carter 
Jimmy Aubrey as Postmaster Jed
George Chang as Elmer the Cook

References

External links
 

1938 films
American Western (genre) films
1938 Western (genre) films
Monogram Pictures films
Films directed by Alan James
American black-and-white films
1930s English-language films
1930s American films